
The Sihlsee (in English sometimes called Lake Sihl) is an artificial lake in the Swiss canton of Schwyz, near the town of Einsiedeln. The lake was created by damming the river Sihl and flooding a section of the upper Sihl Valley.

The power plant project started in 1932. A concrete dam and two viaducts over the lake were built before 1937 when the valley was flooded. As a result 107 farms disappeared completely and 1762 persons had to leave their homes.

This threat has led the City of Zürich to develop, publish and test evacuation plans for the affected areas of the city, and especially the area around Zürich Hauptbahnhof railway station.

Gallery

References

External links 

Information about the Sihlsee

Lakes of the canton of Schwyz
Reservoirs in Switzerland
LSihlsee
Sihl